The 1990 Detroit Tigers season was the 90th season in franchise history. The Tigers finished in third place in the American League East, with a record of 79-83. They scored 750 runs and allowed 754. Notably, Cecil Fielder reached the 50 home run plateau, the first and last Detroit Tiger to hit at least 50 home runs since Hank Greenberg in 1938.

Offseason
 December 4, 1989: Steve Wapnick was drafted by the Tigers from the Toronto Blue Jays in the 1989 rule 5 draft.
 December 5, 1989: Tony Phillips was signed as a free agent by the Tigers.
 December 6, 1989: Bill Henderson (minors), Marcos Betances (minors), and Pat Austin (minors) were traded by the Tigers to the St. Louis Cardinals for Jim Lindeman and Matt Kinzer.
 December 7, 1989: Lloyd Moseby was signed as a free agent by the Tigers.
 December 8, 1989: Rick Schu was released by the Tigers.
 December 20, 1989: Willie Hernández was released by the Tigers.
 January 15, 1990: Cecil Fielder was signed as a free agent by the Tigers.
 January 15, 1990: Ed Romero was signed as a free agent by the Tigers.

Regular season
 October 3, 1990: Cecil Fielder hit two home runs at Yankee Stadium to finish with 51 for the season. The 50th home run was hit off of Steve Adkins. Fielder was the first major leaguer since George Foster in 1977 to hit 50 home runs in a season. It was the 18th time that a major leaguer (and the 11th time that an American League player) hit 50 home runs in a season.

Opening Day starters
 3B Tony Phillips
 SS Alan Trammell
 2B Lou Whitaker
 1B Cecil Fielder
 CF Lloyd Moseby
 C  Matt Nokes
 LF Gary Ward
 RF Chet Lemon
 DH Dave Bergman
 SP Jack Morris

Season standings

Record vs. opponents

Notable transactions
 May 1, 1990: Steve Wapnick was returned by the Tigers to the Toronto Blue Jays.
 June 4, 1990: Tony Clark was drafted by the Tigers in the 1st round of the 1990 Major League Baseball draft.
 June 13, 1990: John Shelby was signed as a free agent by the Tigers.
 June 18, 1990: Kenny Williams was selected off waivers from the Tigers by the Toronto Blue Jays.
 June 18, 1990: Tracy Jones was traded by the Tigers to the Seattle Mariners for Darnell Coles.
 July 15, 1990: Ed Romero was released by the Detroit Tigers.

Roster

Player stats

Batting

Starters by position
Note: Pos = Position; G = Games played; AB = At bats; H = Hits; Avg. = Batting average; HR = Home runs; RBI = Runs batted in

Other batters
Note: G = Games played; AB = At bats; H = Hits; Avg. = Batting average; HR = Home runs; RBI = Runs batted in

Pitching

Starting pitchers
Note: G = Games pitched; IP = Innings pitched; W = Wins; L = Losses; ERA = Earned run average; SO = Strikeouts

Other pitchers
Note: G = Games pitched; IP = Innings pitched; W = Wins; L = Losses; ERA = Earned run average; SO = Strikeouts

Relief pitchers
Note: G = Games pitched; IP = Innings pitched; W = Wins; L = Losses; SV = Saves; ERA = Earned run average; SO = Strikeouts

Awards and honors
 Cecil Fielder, Major League Home Run Champion (51)
 Cecil Fielder, American League RBI Champion (132)
 Cecil Fielder, Silver Slugger Award
MLB All-Star Game
 Cecil Fielder, first base, reserve
 Alan Trammell, shortstop, reserve

Team leaders
 Home Runs – Cecil Fielder (51)
 Runs Batted In – Cecil Fielder (132)

Fielder's Fifty-One Home Runs

Farm system

LEAGUE CHAMPIONS: London<ref>Johnson, Lloyd, and Wolff, Miles, ed., The Encyclopedia of Minor League Baseball". Durham, North Carolina: Baseball America, 1997</ref>

References

External links

1990 Detroit Tigers at Baseball Reference''
1990 Detroit Tigers on Baseball Almanac

Detroit Tigers seasons
Detroit Tigers season
Detroit
1990 in Detroit